OSGi is an open specification and open source project under the Eclipse Foundation.  It is a continuation of the work done by the OSGi Alliance (formerly known as the Open Services Gateway initiative), which was an open standards organization for computer software founded in March 1999. The foundation originally specified and maintained the OSGi standard. The alliance transferred its work to the Eclipse Foundation at the end of 2020.  The OSGi specification describes a modular system and a service platform for the Java programming language that implements a complete and dynamic component model, something that does not exist in standalone Java or VM environments.  It has a service-oriented architecture based on micro services each implemented as an extended Java class file archive (JAR (file format)).

Description

OSGi is built around a service-oriented architecture.  Applications or components, come in the form of bundles for deployment, can be remotely installed, started, stopped, updated, and uninstalled without requiring a reboot.  Management of Java packages/classes is specified in great detail. Application life cycle management is implemented via APIs that enable remote downloading of management policies. The service registry enables bundles to detect the addition of new services or the removal of services, and adapt accordingly.

The OSGi specifications have evolved beyond the original focus of service gateways, and are now used in applications ranging from mobile phones to the open-source Eclipse IDE. Other application areas include automobiles, industrial automation, building automation, PDAs, grid computing, entertainment, fleet management and application servers.

In October 2020, the OSGi Alliance announced the transition of the standardization effort to the Eclipse Foundation, subsequent to which it would shut down.  All artifacts have been transferred to the Eclipse Foundation, where an OSGi Working Group" continues to maintain and evolve the specification.

 Specification process 
The OSGi specification is developed by the members in an open process and made available to the public free of charge under the OSGi Specification License. The OSGi Alliance has a compliance program that is open to members only. As of November 2010, there are seven certified OSGi framework implementations. A separate page lists both certified and non-certified OSGi Specification Implementations, which include OSGi frameworks and other OSGi specifications.

 Architecture 

OSGi is a Java framework for developing and deploying modular software programs and libraries. Each bundle is a tightly coupled, dynamically loadable collection of classes, jars, and configuration files that explicitly declare their external dependencies (if any).

The framework is conceptually divided into the following areas:
BundlesBundles are normal JAR components with extra manifest headers.
ServicesThe services layer connects bundles in a dynamic way by offering a publish-find-bind model for plain old Java interfaces (POJIs) or plain old Java objects (POJOs).
Services RegistryThe application programming interface for management services.
Life-CycleThe application programming interface for life cycle management (install, start, stop, update, and uninstall) for bundles.
ModulesThe layer that defines encapsulation and declaration of dependencies (how a bundle can import and export code).
SecurityThe layer that handles the security aspects by limiting bundle functionality to pre-defined capabilities.
Execution EnvironmentDefines what methods and classes are available in a specific platform. There is no fixed list of execution environments, since it is subject to change as the Java Community Process creates new versions and editions of Java. However, the following set is currently supported by most OSGi implementations:
CDC-1.0/Foundation-1.0
CDC-1.1/Foundation-1.1
OSGi/Minimum-1.0
OSGi/Minimum-1.1
JRE-1.1
From J2SE-1.2 up to J2SE-1.6

Bundles

A bundle is a group of Java classes and additional resources equipped with a detailed manifest MANIFEST.MF file on all its contents, as well as additional services needed to give the included group of Java classes more sophisticated behaviors, to the extent of deeming the entire aggregate a component.

Below is an example of a typical MANIFEST.MF file with OSGi Headers:
 Bundle-Name: Hello World
 Bundle-SymbolicName: org.wikipedia.helloworld
 Bundle-Description: A Hello World bundle
 Bundle-ManifestVersion: 2
 Bundle-Version: 1.0.0
 Bundle-Activator: org.wikipedia.Activator
 Export-Package: org.wikipedia.helloworld;version="1.0.0"
 Import-Package: org.osgi.framework;version="1.3.0"
The meaning of the contents in the example is as follows:

 Bundle-Name: Defines a human-readable name for this bundle, Simply assigns a short name to the bundle.
 Bundle-SymbolicName: The only required header, this entry specifies a unique identifier for a bundle, based on the reverse domain name convention (used also by the java packages).
 Bundle-Description: A description of the bundle's functionality.
 Bundle-ManifestVersion: Indicates the OSGi specification to use for reading this bundle.
 Bundle-Version: Designates a version number to the bundle.
 Bundle-Activator: Indicates the class name to be invoked once a bundle is activated.
 Export-Package: Expresses which Java packages contained in a bundle will be made available to the outside world.
 Import-Package:' Indicates which Java packages will be required from the outside world to fulfill the dependencies needed in a bundle.

 Life-cycle 

A Life Cycle layer adds bundles that can be dynamically installed, started, stopped, updated and uninstalled. Bundles rely on the module layer for class loading but add an API to manage the modules in run time. The life cycle layer introduces dynamics that are normally not part of an application. Extensive dependency mechanisms are used to assure the correct operation of the environment. Life cycle operations are fully protected with the security architecture.

Below is an example of a typical Java class implementing the BundleActivator interface:
package org.wikipedia;

import org.osgi.framework.BundleActivator;
import org.osgi.framework.BundleContext;

public class Activator implements BundleActivator {
	private BundleContext context;

	@Override
	public void start(BundleContext context) throws Exception {
		System.out.println("Starting: Hello World");
		this.context = context;
	}

	@Override
	public void stop(BundleContext context) throws Exception {
		System.out.println("Stopping: Goodbye Cruel World");
		this.context = null;
	}
}

Services

Standard services
The OSGi Alliance has specified many services. Services are specified by a Java interface. Bundles can implement this interface and register the service with the Service Registry. Clients of the service can find it in the registry, or react to it when it appears or disappears.

The table below shows a description of OSGi System Services:

The table below shows a description of OSGi Protocol Services:

The table below shows a description of OSGi Miscellaneous Services:

 Organization 
The OSGi Alliance was founded by Ericsson, IBM, Motorola, Sun Microsystems and others in March 1999. Before incorporating as a nonprofit corporation, it was called the Connected Alliance.

Among its members are  more than 35 companies from quite different business areas, for example Adobe Systems, Deutsche Telekom, Hitachi, IBM, Liferay, Makewave, NEC, NTT, Oracle, Orange SA, ProSyst, Salesforce, Siemens, Software AG and TIBCO Software.

The Alliance has a board of directors that provides the organization's overall governance.  OSGi officers have various roles and responsibilities in supporting the alliance. Technical work is conducted within Expert Groups (EGs) chartered by the board of directors, and non-technical work is conducted in various working groups and committees. The technical work conducted within Expert Groups include developing specifications, reference implementations, and compliance tests. These Expert Groups have produced five major releases of the OSGi specifications.

Dedicated Expert Groups exist for the enterprise, mobile, vehicle and the core platform areas.

The Enterprise Expert Group (EEG) is the newest EG and is addressing Enterprise / Server-side applications.
In November 2007 the Residential Expert Group (REG) started to work on specifications to remotely manage residential/home-gateways.
In October 2003, Nokia, Motorola, IBM, ProSyst and other OSGi members formed a Mobile Expert Group (MEG) that will specify a MIDP-based service platform for the next generation of smart mobile phones, addressing some of the needs that CLDC cannot manage - other than CDC. MEG became part of OSGi as with R4.

 Specification versions 
 OSGi Release 1 (R1): May 2000
 OSGi Release 2 (R2): October 2001
 OSGi Release 3 (R3): March 2003
 OSGi Release 4 (R4): October 2005 / September 2006
 Core Specification (R4 Core): October 2005
 Mobile Specification (R4 Mobile / JSR-232): September 2006
 OSGi Release 4.1 (R4.1): May 2007 (AKA JSR-291)
 OSGi Release 4.2 (R4.2): September 2009
 Enterprise Specification (R4.2): March 2010
 OSGi Release 4.3 (R4.3): April 2011
 Core: April 2011
 Compendium and Residential: May 2012
 OSGi Release 5 (R5): June 2012
 Core and Enterprise: June 2012
 OSGi Release 6 (R6): June 2015
 Core: June 2015
 OSGi Release 7 (R7): April 2018
 Core and Compendium: April 2018
 OSGi Release 8 (R8): December 2020

 Related standards 
MHP / OCAP
Universal Plug and Play (UPnP)
DPWS
ITU-T G.hn
LonWorks
CORBA
CEBus
EHS (KNX) / CECED CHAIN
Java Management Extensions

 Projects using OSGi 
 Adobe Experience Manager - an enterprise Content Management System
 Apache Aries - Blueprint Container implementations and extensions of application-focused specifications defined by OSGi Enterprise Expert Group
 Apache Sling - OSGi-based applications layer for JCR content repositories
 Atlassian Confluence and JIRA - the plug-in architecture for this enterprise wiki and issue tracker uses OSGi
 Business Intelligence and Reporting Tools (BIRT) Project - Open source reporting engine
 Cytoscape - an open source bioinformatics software platform (as of version 3.0)
 DataNucleus - open source data services and persistence platform in service-oriented architectures
DDF - Distributed Data Framework provides free and open-source data integration
 Dotcms - open source Web Content Management
 EasyBeans - open source EJB 3 container
 Eclipse - open source IDE and rich client platform
 iDempiere - is an OSGi implementation of the open source ERP Branch GlobalQSS Adempiere361 originally started by Low Heng Sin
 Eclipse Virgo - open source microkernel-based server constructed of OSGi bundles and supporting OSGi applications
 GlassFish (v3) - application server for Java EE
 Fuse ESB - a productized and supported release of ServiceMix 4.
 Integrated Genome Browser - an open source, desktop GUI for visualizing, exploring, and analyzing genome data
 IntelliJ - Java IDE and rich client platform with free community edition
 JBoss - Red Hat's JBoss Application Server
 JOnAS 5 - open source Java EE 5 application server
 JOSSO 2 - Atricore's open source standards-based Identity and Access Management Platform
 Liferay Dxp - open source and commercial enterprise Portal platform use OSGi from version 7.x.
 Lucee 5 - open source CFML Web Application Server
 NetBeans - open source IDE and rich client platform
 Nuxeo - open source ECM Service Platform
 Open Daylight Project - Project with the goal of accelerating the adoption of software-defined networking
 OpenEJB - open source OSGi-enabled EJB 3.0 container that can be run both in standalone or embedded mode
 openHAB - open source home automation software
 OpenWorm - open source software simulation of C. elegans, via the dedicated Geppetto'' modular platform
 Akana - API Gateway, Portal and Analytics server from Akana (formerly SOA Software)
 Weblogic - Oracle Weblogic Application Server
 WebSphere - IBM Websphere JEE Application Server
 WebMethods - SoftwareAG WebMethods
 WSO2 Carbon - Base platform for WSO2's enterprise-grade Open source middleware stack

Current framework implementations

See also
 OSGi Specification Implementations

References

Further reading

External links

Oredev 2008 - Architecture - OSGi Now and Tomorrow
 Eclipse Equinox Article Index - Articles on an open source OSGi implementation

Standards organizations in the United States
Articles with example Java code
Free software programmed in Java (programming language)
1999 establishments in the United States
Embedded systems
Organizations based in California